Alderville is one of two reserves of the Alderville First Nation, along with Sugar Island 37A. Alderville consists of six non-contiguous areas surrounded by the township of Alnwick/Haldimand. It was previously known as Alderville 37.

References

Mississauga reserves in Ontario
Municipalities in Northumberland County, Ontario